Xorides rufipes is a parasitoid wasp from ichneumonid family that parasitizes long-horned beetle of the subspecies Rhagium inquisitor inquisitor.

References

Xoridinae
Taxa named by Johann Ludwig Christian Gravenhorst
Insects described in 1829